Satish Chandra Rai (12 February 1929 - 28 August 2016) was a surgeon from Uttar Pradesh. He was the first elected mayor of Lucknow and personal doctor to two Prime Ministers.

References 

1937 births
2016 deaths
Politicians from Lucknow
Mayors of Lucknow
Bharatiya Janata Party politicians from Uttar Pradesh